The Canon EOS 7D Mark II is a professional digital single-lens reflex camera made by Canon.  It was announced on September 15, 2014 with a suggested retail price of US$1,799. It features a 20.2 effective megapixel APS-C CMOS sensor, Full HD video recording at 60 fps, 10.0 frames per second continuous shooting, a 100% accuracy viewfinder that offers 1× magnification. It also features a 65-point auto-focus system, a built-in Speedlite transmitter and a new 150k RGB pixels + IR metering sensor. It was preceded by the Canon EOS 7D.

The 7D Mark II was named the "Best Digital SLR Expert" in 2015 by the Technical Image Press Association. Also, the 7D Mark II won the Japanese 2015 Camera Grand Prix (カメラグランプリ) Camera of the Year award.

Features
 20.2 effective megapixel APS-C CMOS sensor
 Dual DIGIC 6 image processors with 14-bit processing
 Liveview mode
 100% viewfinder frame coverage with 1.0× magnification with a 50mm lens
 10.0 frames per second continuous shooting
 ISO sensitivity 100–16,000 (expandable to 51,200)
 3.0-inch Clear View II LCD screen with 1,040,000 dots resolution
 65-point auto-focus system, all cross-type. Center point is high precision, double cross-type with −3 EV sensitivity
 252-zone color-sensitive metering system
 GPS tagging
 EOS Scene Detection System with a new 150,000-pixel/RGB+IR metering sensor.
 Magnesium alloy  body
 Popup flash
 Intervalometer
 Weather sealing (resistance to water and dust)
 In-camera automatic lens distortion correction for most Canon lenses produced since 1995

Autofocus and metering
The 7D Mark II has 65 autofocus points, a similar system as on the Canon EOS 1D X. However, certain lenses do not support all 65 AF points. The AF system uses a translucent LCD display in the viewfinder to overlay image data with the viewfinder image. The EOS 7D Mark II camera features the next generation of Canon's exclusive Dual Pixel CMOS AF (DAF) technology, originally introduced with the Canon EOS 70D camera. Dual Pixel CMOS AF employs proprietary Canon sensor technology in which effective pixels are able to perform both imaging and phase-detection focus measurement simultaneously to achieve dramatically improved AF performance in both video and Live View still imaging modes.

With Canon's Dual Pixel CMOS AF system and customizable Movie Servo AF, the camera provides continuous phase-detection AF during video recording for quick and accurate focus tracking of moving subjects over approximately eighty percent of the image area measured horizontally and vertically. DAF focusing modes include Face Detection with Tracking, FlexiZone Multi with 31 AF zones, and FlexiZone Single that allows users to position a focusing frame on the camera's LCD screen.

Shutter
The shutter is rated to 200,000 shots and is capable of speeds up to 1/8000 s, with a flash sync speed of 1/250 s.  Using compatible external flashes, flash sync speeds up to 1/8000 s are possible. Additionally, the camera can be set to automatically delay its shutter release to compensate for flickering electric lights. The camera's reflex mirror is driven by a motor that slows the mirror to reduce vibration during high-speed shooting. This motor also enables unique new Silent Shooting Modes, which reduce camera noise, at the cost of a slight increase of shutter lag time from 0.055 s to 0.105 s.

Ergonomics
The 7D Mark II has roughly the same dimension as the older 5D Mark III with an updated button layout. It also features a 100% viewfinder with 1× magnification with a 50mm lens.

The 7D Mark II features a dedicated movie mode switch. The camera supports Canon's Stepping Motor (STM) lenses, which significantly reduce focus motor noise from the lens. The EOS 7D Mark II features a stereo microphone port and outputs stereo audio via the camera's mini-HDMI port. The camera is equipped with a headphone jack for real-time audio monitoring, as well as a silent control feature that allows users to adjust audio levels during recordings.

Speed
The 7D Mark II has dual DIGIC 6 processors and can reach 10 frames per second continuous shooting. According to Canon, the buffer throughput allows up to 1,090 frames in large fine JPEG mode and up to 31 frames in raw  when using a UDMA-7 CF Card.

Accessories
When newly purchased, the Canon 7D Mark II model comes equipped with:
 LP-E6N Lithium-Ion Battery Pack for EOS 7D Mark II DSLR Camera
 LC-E6 Charger for LP-E6 Battery Pack
 Eyecup Eg
 RF-3 Camera Cover
 IFC-150U II USB 3.0 Interface Cable for EOS 7D Mark II DSLR
 Wide Camera Strap
 Battery Cover
 Software CD-ROM

Video
The EOS 7D Mark II can shoot in 1080p Full HD or 720p HD video up to 60p, enabling slow-motion capture at full resolution in either ALL-I or IPB codecs with optional embedded timecode. It allows either .MOV and .MP4 recording formats. The camera's mini-HDMI port can be used to record uncompressed Full HD video to external recorders.

References

External links

 Product Page

7D Mark II
Live-preview digital cameras
Cameras introduced in 2014